Nephromopsis yunnanensis is a species of fungus belonging to the family Parmeliaceae.

Synonyms:
 Platysma yunnanensis Nyl., 1888 (basionym)
 Cetraria yunnanensis (Nyl.) Zahlbr., 1911

References

Parmeliaceae
Lichen species
Lichens described in 1992
Lichens of China